Club Esportiu Vilassar de Dalt is the main football club in the town of Vilassar de Dalt. It was founded in 1921 from the merger of the two teams that were in the village, Esbart and Centro de Sports.

Following the local town celebrations, the old sand Vilassar stadium was built. It gave way in 2006 to a modern stadium with artificial turf and capacity for approximately 2000 people.

The club has a total of 200 players from the young squads to the first team. In the 2011-2012 season the club achieved an historic first promotion to Primera Catalana. The sports facilities also have a booth set radio, eight dressing rooms, a bar and parking.

Current squad
As of 24 July 2014.

References

External links
Official website 

Football clubs in Catalonia
Association football clubs established in 1921
CE Vilassar de Dalt